Mission is a city in the Lower Mainland of the province of British Columbia, Canada. It was originally incorporated as a district municipality in 1892, growing to include additional villages and rural areas over the years, adding the original Town of Mission City, long an independent core of the region, in 1969.

Geography
Unlike the other Fraser Valley municipalities, Mission is mostly forested upland with only small floodplains lining the shore of the Fraser River. Some benches of farmland rise in succession northwards above the core developed area of the city. Mission was once the heart of the berry industry in the Fraser Valley, with "Home of the Big Red Strawberry" as Mission's slogan in the 1930s and into the 1940s.

The more southerly portion of the municipality is bounded on the west by the lower reaches of the Stave River, which consists mostly of the lakewaters of two hydroelectric reservoirs, Stave Lake and Hayward Lake. Although the vast majority of the population of Mission lives well to the east of the Stave, over 50% of the northern land area of the municipality is west and north of that river; its extreme northwest corner is on the far side of upper Alouette Lake. A small portion of the lower Stave still runs free in its last two miles before its confluence with the Fraser at Ruskin; its last three-quarters of a mile forms the border with the larger municipality of Maple Ridge to the west.

Over 40% of Mission is actually tree farm, making it only one of two communities with municipal tree farms. (Revelstoke BC, with a much smaller and newer farm, is the second.) Mission's tree farm celebrated its 50th anniversary in 2008.  It comprises much of the northern part of the district, including the area west of the Stave River, up to the district's northern boundary near the foot of Mount Robie Reid; a small sliver of Mission District is at the head of Alouette Lake (normally thought of as being in Maple Ridge).

The eastern boundary of the municipality roughly coincides with the division between the Mission upland and the alluvial floodplain of Hatzic Prairie, which resembles much of the rest of the Fraser Valley Lowland. The unincorporated communities from Hatzic eastwards through Dewdney and Nicomen Island to Deroche are part of the social and commercial matrix centred on Mission but have never joined the municipality, as is also the case with areas north of Hatzic and Dewdney such as McConnell Creek and Durieu; the local economy and societies are built on dairy, berry and corn farming as well as a large First Nations community at the Indian Reserves of the Leq' a: mel First Nation, formerly known as the Lakahahmen First Nation, on Nicomen Island and Deroche.

Government
In 1922 the District of Mission was partitioned by the creation of the Village of Mission, which later became the Village of Mission City, then the Town of Mission City, until amalgamated with the District by plebiscite in 1969.

The City of Mission uses the current Council-Manager system of local government. The present Council, was elected on October 15, 2022. The current mayor is Paul Horn. A notable past mayor is Pam Alexis who resigned as the mayor of Mission in November 2020 after winning a seat for the provincial riding of Abbotsford-Mission in the Legislative Assembly of British Columbia.

History

The Town of Mission City took its name from the local St. Mary's Mission and Residential School established earlier in 1861 and began as a land promotion. The town's core commercial properties and residential streets were auctioned off through James Horne's auction, the "Great Land Sale" May 19, 1891, with buyers brought in via the CPR mainline from Vancouver as well as from Eastern Canada. Soon afterwards, Harry Brown French, an American from New York, came to the city and founded the Mission Regional Chamber of Commerce on June 19, 1893. It was the first Board of Trade in B.C." Some of the early houses and commercial buildings were, in fact, specifically designed to be reminiscent of small towns in southern Ontario in order to encourage buyers. Hailed at the time as a new metropolis, the fledgling town's location at the junction of the Canadian Pacific Railway mainline with a northward extension of the Burlington Northern Railroad brought name suggestions that included East Vancouver and North Seattle. The name Mission City was chosen due to the site's proximity to the historic St. Mary's Mission of the Oblate order just east of town, which was founded in 1868 (now the Peckquaylis Indian Reserve).

At the time of founding, the swing-span Mission Railway Bridge opened in 1891 was the only crossing of the Fraser River in the Fraser Valley below the Alexandra Bridge, and all rail traffic between Vancouver and the United States was necessarily routed through Mission until the New Westminster Bridge at New Westminster was built in 1904. The rail bridge at Mission doubled duty as a one-way alternating vehicular bridge until 1973, when a long-promised new Mission Bridge was finally completed. The bridge's location is geographically important at the head of the tidal bore on the Fraser River, and its water level gauge is an important measure of the Fraser's annual and sometimes dangerously large spring freshet.

Mission City's original retail core was in the small area of lowland between the CPR mainline and the river. Following the great flood of 1894 a few years after the town's founding, the core was relocated just north of the rail line at the foot of the hillside rising above the rail junction. This small commercial strip, originally named Washington Avenue, later Main Street and since the 1980s called First Avenue, is only four or five blocks long and was one of the principal commercial centres of the Fraser Valley for many decades and had a lively retail trade and social life.  Following the 1894 flood, abandoned buildings and lots in the old downtown were taken over by Chinese merchants and workers, creating a Chinatown which lasted until the 1920s.

The western part of the district, the Stave Valley, is largely rural and forested but its watercourse is home to what was the largest hydroelectric project in British Columbia until the Bridge River Power Project opened in 1961. It was built by the British Columbia Electric Railway (BCER) to provide power to the electric street railway and interurban system in Vancouver. The Stave Falls Power Co. operated a light-gauge railway for passenger and freight service up the lower canyon of the river to the dam at Stave Falls. During the construction of the Ruskin Dam (completed 1931) the railway was rebuilt at a higher elevation so as to skirt the new Hayward Lake reservoir. The rail line has long been discontinued, but the old grade and its trestles are now part of a recreation trail circling the reservoir.

Flanking the outraces of the powerhouse at Stave Falls there was once a fairly large community (300 houses), which was served by the railway via connections to the CPR line at Ruskin, although the (then very rough) Dewdney Trunk Road used the dam to cross the Stave River. Population in the Stave Falls area is now away from the dams, west along the Dewdney Trunk towards Maple Ridge, in a rural farm-and-wilderness area south of Rolley Lake Provincial Park.

Up against the Maple Ridge boundary near the waterfront on the west side of the Stave, and halfway between the dam and the mills at Ruskin, was a large drive-in theatre for many years. It is now a large trailer park, and the most populated of Ruskin's neighbourhoods.

The building of the Highway 1 freeway on the south side of the Fraser in the early 1960s brought huge population growth and large shopping malls to formerly rural Abbotsford, Matsqui, Sumas and Langley; as a result Mission lost its "anchor", the main Eaton's department store in the Valley, and the town's Main Street businesses lost much of their business to the new shopping malls a few minutes away across the river. This process was accelerated with the opening of the new bridge in the mid-1970s.

Despite a cohesive business community and new retail malls on the edges of the old core, Mission's retail community has never regained its former prominence in the Fraser Valley. Burgeoning "exurban" population growth connected with the rapid growth of the population of the Lower Mainland and encouraged by a new commuter rail line direct to downtown Vancouver, the West Coast Express, has reversed this trend.
Outside of the core "urban" area, most of which had been the Town of Mission City, the former District of Mission was a collection of distinct rural communities, each with their own history and sometimes distinct ethnic flavour. Silverdale, 7 kilometres west of Mission on the east bank of the lower Stave River, was homesteaded in the 1880s by Italian immigrants (including the Gagliardi family); their descendants reside there to this day. Neighbouring Silverhill was founded by a Finnish Utopian sect who were superseded by Scandinavian and German settlers following a forest fire that virtually wiped out the Finns.

Steelhead, in the northern part of the district, was originally a weekend retreat for some of Vancouver's press community. Other localities such as Ferndale, Cedar Valley and Hatzic were farming communities of mixed origin, with Europeans and anglicized French-Canadians alongside the usual English-Scottish Canadian mix typical of much of the Fraser Valley. Throughout the Mission area before World War II, there was a large Japanese-Canadian population involved in berry farming, logging and milling and in the fishery on the river.

In 1954, Benedictine monks obtained land near Mission, where they set up their Westminster Abbey and Seminary of Christ the King. They have lived there ever since, running their own farm and teaching high school and college men at the seminary.

The berry industry, formerly the district's largest and most important, formed the heart of the town's annual summer party, the Strawberry Festival. The Strawberry Festival began in 1946, when it was suggested by the Board of Trade. But with the impacts on this industry (relocation of the Japanese during wartime and the devastating flood of 1948), the strawberry theme was abandoned. The town acquired the rights to the Western Canada championships of the Soap Box Derby, which were held annually in a specially built facility until 1973; the Derby has been revived in the new millennium.

Mission's other major industry was logging, and the town's several mills were noted for being the world's largest suppliers of red cedar shakes and shingles. The District of Mission has operated for many years its own tree farm, covering most of its northern and northwestern mountainous forests. This tree farm served as a model for silvicultural management on a larger scale throughout British Columbia as well as provided a unique income source for the municipality. From 1967 through the 1970s the Soap Box Derby shared Dominion Day with a large Loggers Sports event, one of the largest in British Columbia and important on the North American Loggers Sports Association circuit.

In the 1960s and 1970s there was a large cluster of productive mills on the waterfront in Mission, for many years world capital of red cedar shake production (the mill at Whonnock outproduced the largest of the Mission mills, but Mission's city of mills was the largest overall producer). Nearby Eddy Match Co., between Mission and Hatzic, was the largest matchstick-making plant in the world until it closed in the 1960s; its only rival was in Hull, Quebec.

Adjoining it was the Empress Foods Co. cannery, the survivor of the struggles of the berry industry in the Central Fraser Valley, and dating from the days of Mission's supremacy as strawberry capital of the valley before the 1948 Fraser River flood wiped it out. In more recent times one of these buildings was for a while converted into the province's largest marijuana grow-op, in a scandal involving one of the town's wealthiest families.

Mission is noted as the home of a long-established professional dragstrip, Mission Raceway Park, which was moved in relatively recent times outside the dyking of the lower part of town to reduce noise in residential and commercial areas nearby.

In 1972 a large tract of land in central Mission's Ferndale area, flat upland at the top of the slope above downtown, was acquired by the federal government and developed into two large penal facilities. One is a minimum security facility, and the other is a medium security prison. The northern part of the district, and the wilds of the Stave River basin to the north of it, are home to a few wilderness work camps for young offenders and low-risk convicts; these camps have over recent decades participated in the ongoing clearing of vast forests of flooded-out trees from the inundated areas of Stave Lake, opening the lake to water recreation and public exploration.

On March 29, 2021, the District of Mission was reclassified as a city.

Economy
Historically, forestry, hydroelectricity and agriculture were Mission's chief resource sectors and provided the basis for varied related retail and service activities. In recent history, transportation improvements have enabled the manufacturing sector to expand beyond sawmilling and food processing.

Forest and wood related industries dominate the manufacturing sector, with an emphasis on redcedar shake and shingle mills. Mission also holds the only municipal tree farm license in British Columbia.

Agriculture is mostly restricted to a narrow belt along the Fraser River, and the unincorporated Dewdney-Deroche district east of Mission contains the majority of the farms in the area. There are about 96 commercial and hobby farms in the area. Dairy is the chief agricultural enterprise; other income sources include poultry, hogs, beef and vegetables.

Mission's largest employer is the local school district, School District #75, and its second largest employer is the District (i.e. the municipality) itself.

Transportation

Transportation infrastructure includes Abbotsford-Mission Highway 11, and the Lougheed Highway 7. Mission is also accessible through commuter rail, the West Coast Express, which runs five trains in each direction a day, five days a week, between Vancouver and Mission City Station.  Bus service in Mission is served by the Central Fraser Valley Transit System connecting with the City of Abbotsford, as well as TransLink with service to Coquitlam Central Station via route 701.
Three days per week Via Rail's The Canadian provides eastbound flag stop service from Mission Harbour railway station.

Mission differs from some of the other Fraser Valley communities because of its access to the Fraser River. The Fraser near Mission is for the most part undeveloped and unspoiled which makes Mission the launch point for many water based activities that happen year round. Boat tours run from Mission's docks on Harbour Avenue, which are also home to sport and commercial fishing vessels; the Fraser has famous salmon runs and population of green sturgeon.

Climate
Mission has an oceanic climate (Köppen climate classification Cfb) due to its proximity to the Pacific Ocean. However, Mission has plentiful rainfall all year round, with a drying trend in the summer.

Demographics

The community has a young population, with a median age of 36.4, according to the 2001 Canadian census,

Ethnicity 
The largest group is European Canadian, comprising approximately 74% of the population, but even within that Mission's ethnic makeup is very complex, with, in addition to British settlers, large numbers of Germans and Dutch, but also Finns, Norwegians and other Scandinavians, Italians, Hungarians, Poles, anglicized French-Canadians and others.

There is a sizeable First Nations community, forming 8.6% of the population. The Peckquaylis Indian Reserve, which is the former St. Mary's Residential School and its grounds, is a centre for services and governments of the Sto:lo communities in the area to the east.

The largest visible minority group in Mission are South Asians, primarily Indo-Canadians comprising 10.7% of the population. Mission's Indo-Canadian community was active since the early 1900s. An Indo-Canadian volleyball team, "Mission Sikhs", was active in the area. Naranjan Grewall became the first Indo-Canadian elected to public office when he took a position in Mission City's government. According to the 2021 Canadian census, the South Asian population in Mission stood at 4,330 persons, forming approximately 10.7% of the total population, up from 2,220 persons or 6.6% of the total population as of the 2006 Canadian census.

Mission's Japanese Canadian community began in 1904, when Kumekichi Fujino moved to the city. Many issei, or first time immigrants, included prospective farmers and "picture brides", or women who communicated with suitors through the mail for the purpose of marriage. Organizations established in Mission included the  Japanese Farmer's Association (Nokai), established in 1916; the Mission Judo Club; the Mission Buddhist Church; and a Japanese Language School. The ethnic Japanese people in Mission had  of land on 103 properties by 1930. During the pre-World War II era 30% of Mission's public school enrollment consisted of ethnic Japanese. The Nokai had 79 members in 1942. The World War II-era Japanese Canadian internment disrupted Mission's ethnic Japanese community as their properties were confiscated, and productivity decreased as the farms were managed by their new non-Japanese. Many Japanese chose not to move back to Mission in the post-war era, even though they were permitted to come back in 1949. In 2006 there were 145 Japanese living in Mission, making up 4.1% of the city's visible minorities.

Note: Totals greater than 100% due to multiple origin responses.

Religion 
According to the 2021 census, religious groups in Mission included:
Irreligion (23,160 persons or 57.0%)
Christianity (12,905 persons or 31.8%)
Sikhism (3,275 persons or 8.1%)
Hinduism (380 persons or 0.9%)
Islam (285 persons or 0.7%)
Buddhism (275 persons or 0.7%)
Judaism (55 persons or 0.1%)
Indigenous Spirituality (35 persons or 0.1%)

Education
School District 75 Mission operates public schools in the District of Mission and in the unincorporated areas to the east.  Students from Deroche/Lake Errock, Dewdney, Nicomen Island, Hatzic Island and Hatzic Prairie/Durieu and McConnell Creek elementary schools attend post-secondary at Mission Secondary School.

The Conseil scolaire francophone de la Colombie-Britannique operates one Francophone school: école des Deux-rives primary school.

Sports

Mission has a mix of sport offerings locally standard to any municipality in this region.  One exception is the large outdoor trail network within the Tree Farm and Interpretive Forest.  Mission is home to world-class mountain bike trails as well as plenty of backcountry hiking opportunities that lie within the District Limits.

Mission is home to a Pacific Junior Hockey League team - the Mission CityOutlaws.

Media

Notable people
Pop singer and Canadian Idol finalist Carly Rae Jepsen
1976 Olympic silver medalist swimmer Gary MacDonald
Big band era musician Mart Kenney and his wife, Norma Locke
singer-songwriter and Juno nominee Paul Janz
2005 CFOX Seeds winner Dave Faber and Ray Bull of 604 Records' recording artist Faber Drive
1988 Olympic short-track speedskater Eden Donatelli
Swimmer Brent Hayden (Canadian Record holder in the 50m, 100m, & 200m freestyle, 2007 100m freestyle World Champion, 3x Olympian (2004, 2008, 2012), and 2012 Olympic Bronze Medalist)
Actor Graham Wardle from Heartland
WNBA (Sacramento Monarchs) basketball player Kim Smith
1996 and 2000 Olympic swimmer Shannon Shakespeare
Electro-pop singer Lights Poxleitner and her husband, blessthefallBlessthefall vocalist Beau Bokan
High jump athlete Debbie Brill
Justice of the Superior Court of Justice, Ontario Todd Ducharme
Former logging company owner and British Columbia political figure Norman Jacobsen
Margaret Lyons, first female vice-president of the Canadian Broadcasting Corporation.
Hip-hop artist Powfu.
Hip-hop artist Lil Windex
Political Rapper Tom MacDonald

Neighbourhoods

Mission's neighbourhoods include a number of rural localities which were part of the District Municipality before amalgamation and which still have some strong local identity.  The following list is incomplete, due to the emergence of modern-era development neighbourhoods, but covers the historical localities (usually defined by a school and a store of the same name):

Cade-Barr
Cedar Valley
Clay Road
Cherry Hill
Deroche
Dewdney
Historic Downtown- 1st Avenue business strip 
Historic Central Mission- 2nd Avenue to 7th Avenue
Hatzic
Hillside
Ferndale
Keystone Road
Silverdale
Silverhill
Stave Falls
Stave Gardens
Ruskin (also part of Maple Ridge)
Steelhead
Richards Road
West Heights

Non-Mission District neighbourhoods
Unincorporated communities and rural areas to the east of Mission are linked closely to Mission, partly because of School District No. 75 but also because Mission is the dominant service centre for the north side of the Fraser between Maple Ridge and Agassiz-Kent.  These communities include:
Hatzic Valley
Durieu
Hatzic Prairie
Hatzic Island
McConnell Creek
Miracle Valley
Dewdney
Nicomen Island
Deroche
Lake Errock

Neighbouring communities

Sister cities
 Oyama, Shizuoka, Japan, since October 1996

Freedom of the City
The following people and military units have received the Freedom of the City of Mission.

Individuals
 Abraham "Abe" Neufeld: 2007.
 Valerie Billesberger: 26 April 2022.
 James "Jim" Hinds: 26 April 2022.
 Glen Kask: 26 April 2022.
 Doug Pearson: 26 April 2022.

See also 
 Mission Bridge
 Mission Railway Bridge

Notes

References

Schroeder, Andreas. Carved from Wood: Mission, B.C. 1861-1992 The Mission Foundation (1991). 
Cherrington, John. Mission on the Fraser Mitchell Press (1974).  ISBN B0006CL344

External links

 
Cities in British Columbia
Populated places in the Fraser Valley Regional District
Populated places on the Fraser River
Populated places established in 1868
1868 establishments in Canada